Ysgol Bro Ddyfi was a bilingual school, offering teaching in Welsh and English, and was based in the town of Machynlleth, Powys, Wales. It was  a BAND 3 school according to the Welsh school banding table of 2013, previously BAND 2 in 2012 and BAND 4 in 2011.

The school closed in 2014 after many years of success. To be reopened the following school year, September 2014 as Ysgol Bro Hyddgen; a new age 3 to 18 years school. Merging Ysgol Bro Ddyfi and Ysgol Gynradd Machynlleth, over 2 campuses.

References

Bro Ddyfi